The 1998 NCAA Division I softball tournament was the seventeenth annual tournament to determine the national champion of NCAA women's collegiate softball. Held during May 1998, thirty-two Division I college softball teams contested the championship. The tournament featured eight regionals of four teams, each in a double elimination format. The 1998 Women's College World Series was held in Oklahoma City, Oklahoma from May 21 through May 25 and marked the conclusion of the 1998 NCAA Division I softball season.  Fresno State won their first NCAA championship by defeating Arizona 1–0 in the final game.  Fresno State pitcher Amanda Scott was named Women's College World Series Most Outstanding Player.

Qualifying

Regionals

Regional No. 1

Arizona qualifies for WCWS.

Regional No. 2

Nebraska qualifies for WCWS.

Regional No. 3

Michigan qualifies for WCWS.

Regional No. 4

Washington qualifies for WCWS.

Regional No. 5

UMass qualifies for WCWS.

Regional No. 6

Texas qualifies for WCWS

Regional No. 7

Fresno State qualifies for WCWS.

Regional No. 8

Oklahoma State qualifies for WCWS.

Women's College World Series

Participants
Arizona

Fresno State

Results

Bracket

Championship Game

All-Tournament Team
The following players were members of the All-Tournament Team.

References

1998 NCAA Division I softball season
NCAA Division I softball tournament